Marchais-Beton is a former commune in the Yonne department, in Bourgogne-Franche-Comté in north-central France. On 1 January 2016, it was merged into the new commune of Charny-Orée-de-Puisaye.

See also 

Communes of the Yonne department

References 

Former communes of Yonne